Platonia  may refer to:
 Platonia, a plant genus in the family Clusiaceae
 Platonia (philosophy), a hypothetic timeless realm by Julian Barbour containing every possible momentary configuration of the universe
 Platonia (place), a place under the St. Sebastian basilica on the Via Appia in Rome
 Platonia dilemma, a game theory introduced in Douglas Hofstadter's book Metamagical Themas
 a 1998 novel by Romanian writer Mirela Roznoveanu
 a synonym for Neurolepis, a bamboo genus in the family Poaceae
 a fictional planet in the 1962 science fiction-themed children's television show Fireball XL5